Willie L. Lewis (born January 16, 1958) is an American football executive and former professional player. He is currently the Director of Player Personnel for the San Antonio Brahmas of the XFL and was most recently the Assistant Director of Pro Personnel for the Houston Roughnecks of the XFL. He was the general manager for the Memphis Express of the Alliance of American Football (AAF). He previously served as an executive in the National Football League (NFL) for 20 years, including tenures with the Seattle Seahawks and Kansas City Chiefs. Most notably, he was the Seahawks vice president of football operations from 2010 to 2012.

Playing career
Lewis was signed by the Seattle Seahawks as an undrafted free agent in 1980 out of Millersville State College — now Millersville University of Pennsylvania. He played in 26 NFL games, returning 45 kickoffs for a 21.4-yard average and 56 punts for an 8.0-yard average, including a 75-yard touchdown as a rookie versus the Denver Broncos. Following his NFL career, Lewis played three seasons in the United States Football League (USFL) with the Denver Gold (1983) and Houston Gamblers (1984–85). After the USFL's collapse, Lewis continued his playing career in the Canadian Football League (CFL). There he was a member of the Ottawa Roughriders (1986, 1987–88), Montreal Alouettes (1986), Hamilton Tiger-Cats (1989) and Winnipeg Blue Bombers (1989).

Executive career
Lewis was hired by the Kansas City Chiefs of the National Football League on May 16, 2013.

In 2018, Lewis became the general manager of the Memphis Express of the Alliance of American Football. The following year, he was hired by the XFL's Houston Roughnecks as assistant director of pro personnel under fellow ex-AAF GM Randy Mueller.

Personal life
Lewis is the father of Ryan Lewis, an NFL cornerback with the Miami Dolphins and a cousin of ESPN analyst Louis Riddick and Robb Riddick, who is a former running back for the Buffalo Bills.  Will has been married to his wife, Kimmberly, since 1993 and they have 3 grown children, Ryan, Drew and Troy. Will also has a daughter, Krysta.

References

External links
 Millersville Athletic Hall of Fame profile

1958 births
Living people
American football cornerbacks
Atlanta Falcons coaches
Canadian football defensive backs
Denver Gold players
Green Bay Packers executives
Hamilton Tiger-Cats players
Houston Gamblers players
Kansas City Chiefs executives
Maine Black Bears football coaches
Millersville Marauders football coaches
Millersville Marauders football players
Montreal Alouettes players
Ottawa Rough Riders players
Seattle Seahawks executives
Seattle Seahawks players
Winnipeg Blue Bombers players
NFL Europe (WLAF) coaches
People from Quakertown, Pennsylvania
Players of American football from Pennsylvania
Coaches of American football from Pennsylvania
Sportspeople from Bucks County, Pennsylvania